Louis Negin (20 October 1929 – 2 December 2022) was a British-born Canadian actor, best known for his roles in the films of Guy Maddin.

Career 
Born in London, England, and raised in Toronto, Ontario, Negin had his earliest film and television roles in the 1950s Canadian dramatic anthology series First Performance, and as a chorus member in Tyrone Guthrie's 1957 film of the Stratford Festival production of Oedipus Rex. He appeared in the Stratford Festival production of Tamburlaine, which had a run on Broadway in 1956, and later appeared in London productions of Fortune and Men's Eyes and his own play Love and Maple Syrup; in Fortune and Men's Eyes, he became one of the first actors ever to appear fully nude on stage in England.

Negin later appeared in films including The Ernie Game, Can Heironymus Merkin Ever Forget Mercy Humppe and Find True Happiness?, Ooh… You Are Awful, Barry McKenzie Holds His Own, Rabid, Two Solitudes and Highpoint. As well as appearing in TV series such as Brett, Mousey and The Zoo Gang and episodes of King of Kensington and The Littlest Hobo. In the 1980s he had a recurring role on Seeing Things, as well as acting in the television films Overdrawn at the Memory Bank, Freddie the Freeloader's Christmas Dinner and Charlie Grant's War.

In 1994, he acted in drag as Mrs. White in a Toronto production of John Wimbs and Christopher Richards' play Molly Wood. In 1998, he played Noël Coward in a production of Linda Griffiths' play The Duchess at Theatre Passe Muraille. He played Truman Capote, both in a Toronto stage production of the play Tru in 1996 and in the film 54.

In later years, he acted in several of Guy Maddin's films, including Cowards Bend the Knee, Sissy Boy Slap Party, The Saddest Music in the World, Keyhole, and The Forbidden Room as well as narrating Maddin's semi-documentary films Brand Upon the Brain! and My Winnipeg. He also had guest roles in the television series Lord Have Mercy!, Mona the Vampire, ReGenesis and Slings and Arrows, and in Bruce McDonald's film Pontypool.

In 2008, he performed The Glass Eye, a semi-autobiographical play which he wrote in collaboration with Marie Brassard, in Montreal and Toronto.

In 2019, he appeared in Matthew Rankin's film The Twentieth Century, acting in drag as the mother of Prime Minister Mackenzie King. He received a Vancouver Film Critics Circle award nomination for Best Supporting Actor in a Canadian Film.

Personal life and death 
Negin, who was gay, was the partner of former television and film designer Charles Dunlop. In a 2007 interview with Xtra!, Negin described his age as "Write that I'm 95 years old, and that I've been to Hungary to have some work done."

Guy Maddin announced Negin's death on his Instagram on December 3, 2022. Negin had died the previous day, in Montreal, at the age of 93.

Filmography

Films

TV

References

External links

1929 births
2022 deaths
Canadian male film actors
Canadian male television actors
Canadian male voice actors
Canadian male stage actors
Canadian male soap opera actors
English emigrants to Canada
Male actors from London
Writers from London
Canadian gay writers
Canadian gay actors
Canadian LGBT dramatists and playwrights
Canadian male dramatists and playwrights
21st-century Canadian dramatists and playwrights
21st-century Canadian male writers
Jewish Canadian male actors
20th-century Canadian male actors
21st-century Canadian male actors
Gay dramatists and playwrights
21st-century Canadian LGBT people
20th-century Canadian LGBT people